Lieut. Gullivar Jones: His Vacation is the last novel by Edwin Lester Arnold, combining elements of both fantasy and science fiction, first published in 1905. Its lukewarm reception led Arnold to stop writing fiction. It has since become his best-known work, and is considered important in the development of 20th century science fiction in that it is a precursor and likely inspiration to Edgar Rice Burroughs's classic A Princess of Mars (1917), which spawned the planetary romance and sword and planet genres. Ace Books reprinted Arnold's novel in paperback in 1964, retitling it Gulliver  of Mars. A more recent Bison Books edition (2003) was issued as Gullivar of Mars, adapting the Ace title to Arnold's spelling.

Relation to Barsoom books
The concept of a military man going to Mars, exploring strange civilizations and falling in love with a princess had been explored as far back as Percy Greg's Across the Zodiac (1880), but the connections between Gullivar and John Carter, the protagonist of Burroughs' Barsoom novels, are more numerous and stronger. Burroughs' novels bear a number of striking similarities to Arnold's. Both Carter and Gullivar are military men – Carter serving in the Confederate States Army; Jones in the United States Navy – who arrive on Mars by apparently magical means (astral projection in the case of the former, magic carpet in the case of the latter) and have numerous adventures there, including falling in love with Martian princesses. Gullivar is a more hapless character, however, paling beside the heroic and accomplished Carter; he stumbles in and out of trouble and never quite succeeds in mastering it.  The fact that Gullivar does not quite defeat his enemies or get the girl in the end helps explain why Arnold's Martian saga was not as popular as Burroughs', which eventually extended to eleven volumes.

Richard A. Lupoff, the first critic to argue for the connection of the two works, has suggested that while Burroughs' Mars was inspired by Arnold's, his hero may harken back to an earlier Arnold creation, the ancient warrior Phra from his first novel, The Wonderful Adventures of Phra the Phoenician (1890).

In other media
Marvel Comics adapted the character for the comic book feature "Gullivar Jones, Warrior of Mars" in Creatures on the Loose #16–21 (March 1972 – January 1973), initially by writer Roy Thomas and the art team of Gil Kane and Bill Everett, and later written by Gerry Conway, followed by science fiction novelist George Alec Effinger. The series moved to Marvel's black and white magazine, Monsters Unleashed No. 4 and No. 8 (1974), written by Tony Isabella with art by David Cockrum and George Pérez. Marvel's version modernized the setting, recasting Gullivar as a Vietnam War veteran. Though this official adaptation used many of Arnold's characters and concepts, it was not a strict adaptation of the original book.

Both Gullivar and John Carter make an appearance at the beginning of Volume II in Alan Moore's The League of Extraordinary Gentlemen comic book series.

Gullivar Jones appears alongside a young Edgar Allan Poe in Jean-Marc Lofficier & Randy Lofficier's novel, Edgar Allan Poe on Mars: The Further adventures of Gullivar Jones (2007).

In the fourth volume of the Tales of the Shadowmen anthology, in the short story "Three Men, a Martian and a Baby," Gullivar Jones is briefly encountered by Doctor Omega.

Dynamite Entertainment's 2012 comic miniseries Warriors of Mars crosses over Gullivar Jones with the Barsoom setting. In the comic, Jones' lover Princess Heru was a Red Martian who went on to marry Mors Kajak and became the mother of Dejah Thoris, the Thither People are an isolationist, seldom-seen species existing alongside the Red and Green Martians, and Arnold's River of Death is equated with Burroughs' River Iss.

In Gullivar Jones and the Treasure of the Tsar (2023), now-retired USN Captain Gullivar Jones joins British MI2 agents Abigail Bradshaw and Archibald Smart to find the Fountain of Eternal Youth before Hitler or Stalin can use its fabled waters to create armies of immortal soldiers.

Audio version

References

External links
 
 Review of Gullivar of Mars on SF Site.
 Foreword to Gulliver of Mars on The Nostalgia League website.
 

1905 British novels
1905 science fiction novels
1905 fantasy novels
British science fiction novels
Science fantasy novels
Planetary romances
Novels set on Mars
Novels adapted into comics